James Robert Bain (1851 – 27 February 1913) was a British Conservative Party politician who represented Egremont, Cumberland in the House of Commons of the United Kingdom from 1900 to 1906.

He died at his home in London on 27 February 1913.

Electoral history

References 

1851 births
1913 deaths
UK MPs 1900–1906
Conservative Party (UK) MPs for English constituencies
People from Egremont, Cumbria